Hillmar may refer to:
Hillmar, California, former name of Hilmar, California
Georg Hilmar, German gymnast sometimes listed as Georg Hillmar